Protobrama is an extinct genus of teleost fish from the Cretaceous period of Lebanon.

It had a deep body, with long dorsal and anal fins, but had no pelvic fin. The position of the pectoral fins high on the body suggests that it was probably a fairly agile fish.

References

Tselfatiiformes
Late Cretaceous fish of Asia